The ivory-billed woodcreeper (Xiphorhynchus flavigaster) is a species of bird of the order of Passeriformes, which are perching birds. It is in the family Furnariidae (ovenbirds) and the subfamily Dendrocolaptinae (woodcreepers).

It is a rather large, fairly common woodcreeper of tropical forest in both dry and humid areas of  Belize, Costa Rica, El Salvador, Guatemala, Honduras, Mexico, and Nicaragua. Its natural habitats are subtropical or tropical dry forest, subtropical or tropical moist lowland forest, subtropical or tropical moist montane forest, and heavily degraded former forest.

The ivory-billed woodcreeper feeds mainly on larger trunks, often probing into bromeliads and moving methodically. Note the long stout bill, which is mostly pale (but not really ivory colored), and the bold streaking on the head, back, and underparts.

Its length is 20–26·5 cm (7.8--10.5 inches; the male weighs 40–62 g (1.4--2.2 oz), and the female weighs 35–56g (1.24–2 oz).

References

External links
Species factsheet - BirdLife International
Videos, photos and sounds - Internet Bird Collection

ivory-billed woodcreeper
Birds of Central America
Birds of Belize
Birds of the Yucatán Peninsula
ivory-billed woodcreeper
Taxonomy articles created by Polbot